Sophora fraseri is a rare species of plant in the family Fabaceae. A shrub to 2 metres tall, found in north eastern New South Wales to south eastern Queensland. The habitat is the edges of rainforest or moist eucalyptus forest.

References 

fraseri
Flora of New South Wales
Flora of Queensland